Danilo Oscar Lancini (born 15 October 1965 in Rovato) is an Italian politician.

He served as Mayor of Adro from 2004 to 2014.

On 17 April 2018 he became MEP, taking over from Matteo Salvini. He was re-elected MEP in the 2019 European Parliament election.

References

Living people
1965 births
MEPs for Italy 2014–2019
MEPs for Italy 2019–2024
Lega Nord MEPs
Lega Nord politicians